Biaklian Paite (born 20 March 1997) is an Indian professional footballer who plays as a midfielder.

Club career
Born in Churachandpur, Manipur, Paite began his career in the youth team of I-League side DSK Shivajians. In August 2016, he was promoted to the first-team for the Durand Cup. Paite then made his professional debut on 5 March 2017 in the I-League against Chennai City. He started and played the whole 90 minutes as the matched in a 1–1 draw.

On 30 July 2018, Paite signed with I-League club NEROCA. He made his debut for the club on 7 November 2018 against Aizawl. He started and played 65 minutes as NEROCA drew the match 0–0.

International career
In June 2015, Paite was selected to join an India U-19 camp.

Career statistics

Club

References

1997 births
Living people
People from Churachandpur district
Indian footballers
Association football midfielders
DSK Shivajians FC players
NEROCA FC players
I-League players
Footballers from Manipur